Tristan Taormino (born May 9, 1971) is an American feminist author, columnist, sex educator, activist, editor, speaker, radio host, and pornographic film director. She is most recently known for her book Opening Up: A Guide to Creating and Sustaining Open Relationships, which is often recommended as an starter guide to polyamory and non-monogamy.

Early life
Taormino is the only child of Judith Bennett Pynchon and William J. Taormino. On her mother's side of the family, Taormino is a descendant of William Pynchon, an early English-American settler. She is also the niece of author Thomas Pynchon. Her parents divorced before she turned two years old, when her father came out as gay. She was raised primarily by her mother on Long Island. She maintained a close relationship with her father Bill Taormino, who died of AIDS in 1995. Taormino attended Sayville High School on Long Island and was salutatorian of her graduating class. She graduated Phi Beta Kappa with a bachelor's degree in American Studies from Wesleyan University in 1993.

Career

Books 
Taormino is the author of seven books, including the Firecracker Book Award-winning The Ultimate Guide to Anal Sex for Women.

She has edited anthologies including the Lambda Literary Award-winning annual anthology series she created and edited from 1996 to 2009, Best Lesbian Erotica, published by Cleis Press.

She was a regular columnist for The Village Voice from 1999 to 2008, where she wrote the bi-weekly sex column "Pucker Up." In print, her column appeared opposite Dan Savage's column Savage Love. She popularized and re-defined the term "queer heterosexual," in her 1995 column "The Queer Heterosexual." She wrote: "In some cases, it's based on either one or both partners having non-traditional gender expressions...or they actively work against their assigned gender roles. Some queer heterosexuals are strongly aligned with queer community, culture, politics, and activism but happen to love and lust after people of a different gender. I also consider folks who embrace alternative models of sexuality and relationships (polyamory, non-monogamy, BDSM, cross-dressing) to be queer, since labeling them "straight," considering their lifestyle choices, seems inappropriate." She was laid off from The Village Voice in 2008. She has written "The Anal Advisor" column for Hustler's Taboo magazine since 1999, and she is a former columnist for Velvetpark. She is the former editor of On Our Backs, the USA's oldest lesbian-produced lesbian sex magazine.

Lectures and controversy 
Taormino has lectured at many colleges and universities, where she speaks on gay and lesbian issues, sexuality and gender, and feminism. Some of her college appearances have stirred controversy, as at University of North Carolina at Greensboro in 2004, Princeton, and, most famously, Oregon State University in 2011, where administrators un-invited her as keynote speaker at the Modern Sex Conference. There was a huge uproar on the internet, and many accused OSU of anti-sex bias. The incident received national media attention. Eventually, students raised the funds and re-invited her themselves.

Film and television
Taormino hosted the television show Sexology 101 on The Burly Bear Network in 2001, a college cable network owned by Lorne Michaels' Broadway Video. She was a regular expert and panelist on Ricki Lake for two seasons in 2002 and 2003. In 2003, she signed a development deal with MTV Networks. She served as host and executive producer on the pilot for The Naughty Show, but the series was never picked up. She has appeared as an expert on sex, relationships, feminism, pornography, non-monogamy, and LGBT issues on Melissa Harris-Perry, Joy Behar: Say Anything, HBO's Real Sex, The Howard Stern Show, Ricki Lake, MTV, and other television shows.

Taormino worked with Spike Lee as a script consultant and with the cast on the set of his 2004 movie She Hate Me. In 2006, she appeared as a so-called "sextra" in John Cameron Mitchell's film, Shortbus, participating in an unsimulated orgy that was filmed for the movie. (Her presence is confirmed by the director on the DVD commentary.) She also appeared in Becky Goldberg's 2003 documentary Hot and Bothered: Feminist Pornography and in Mr. Angel, the documentary about Buck Angel (2013).

In addition to writing, speaking and sex education, she considers herself a feminist pornographer. She made two videos based on her book The Ultimate Guide to Anal Sex for Women. The first (1999) was co-directed by Buttman (John Stagliano) and Ernest Greene. The second (2001) was directed by Tristan herself. In both videos, she takes part in the on-screen sexual activities. Subsequently, she directed Tristan Taormino's House of Ass for Adam & Eve, which shows a number of "porn stars" (from famous to unknown) interacting without a script. In 2006, she directed Tristan Taormino's Chemistry, which is the first in a series of full-length "behind the scenes" movies for Vivid Entertainment where the performers choose who they have sex with, what they do, where and when. She directed four volumes of the Chemistry series as well as sex education films for Vivid Ed, Vivid Entertainment's sex education line that she was instrumental in creating.

Criticism 
Rebecca Whisnant argues that Taormino work's represents a profit-based ‘‘feminist porn’’ within the mainstream pornography industry based upon thin conceptions of feminism and sexual ethics.

Sexual identity
Taormina uses the terms "queer" and "dyke" to describe her sexual identity. In the past, Taormino stated: "I don't really identify with the label 'bisexual', nor does it feel like it accurately describes me...I see myself as queer, since queer to me is not just about who I love or lust, but it's about my culture, my community, and my politics. The truth is, even if I were with a heterosexual guy, I'd be a queer dyke." In addition, "she describes herself as 'equal opportunity'. She doesn't like the word 'bisexual' – and says "it's too polarizing."

In addition to being a vocal advocate of non-monogamy, Taormino supports gay marriage: "I support gay marriage being legalised in every state. I do however think it’s unfortunate that in some cases gay marriage opponents have used the issue against polyamory."

Bibliography 
 The Ultimate Guide to Anal Sex for Women (Cleis Press, 1997/2006)  – winner of a Firecracker Book Award and named Amazon.com's No. 1 Bestseller in Women's Sex Instruction in 1998. Second edition was released in February 2006, 
 Pucker Up: A Hands-on Guide to Ecstatic Sex (ReganBooks, 2001) – re-issued in paperback as Down and Dirty Sex Secrets (2003) 
 True Lust: Adventures in Sex, Porn and Perversion (Cleis Press, 2002) 
 Opening Up: Creating and Sustaining Open Relationships (Cleis Press, 2008) 
 The Anal Sex Position Guide: The Best Positions for Easy, Exciting, Mind-Blowing Pleasure (Quiver, 2009) 
 The Big Book of Sex Toys (Quiver, 2010) 
 Secrets of Great G-Spot Orgasms and Female Ejaculation (Quiver, 2011) 
 50 Shades of Kink: An Introduction to BDSM (Cleis Press, 2012) 

As editor
 Pucker Up: the zine with a mouth that's not afraid to use it (Black Dog Productions, 1995–?) publisher and editor
 Best Lesbian Erotica (Cleis Press, 1996–2009) as Series Editor
 Ritual Sex (Rhinoceros Books, 1996) co-editor
 A Girl's Guide to Taking Over the World: Writings from the Girl Zine Revolution (St. Martin's Press, 1997) co-editor
 Hot Lesbian Erotica (Cleis Press, 2005) editor
 Best Lesbian Bondage Erotica (Cleis Press, 2007) editor
 Sometimes She Lets Me: Best Butch/Femme Erotica (Cleis Press, 2010) editor
 Take Me There: Trans and Genderqueer Erotica (Cleis Press, 2011) editor 
 The Ultimate Guide To Kink: BDSM, Role Play and the Erotic Edge (Cleis Press, 2012) editor 
 Stripped Down: Lesbian Sex Stories (Cleis Press, 2012) editor 
 The Feminist Porn Book: The Politics of Producing Pleasure (Feminist Press, 2013) co-editor 
 When She Was Good: Best Lesbian Erotica'' (Cleis Press, 2014) editor

Journal articles
  Pdf.

Awards

References

External links 

Sophia Smith Collection zines collection at the Sophia Smith Collection, Smith College, containing zines collected by Taormino

1971 births

American advice columnists
American book editors
American sex columnists
American sex educators
American pornographic film actresses
American feminist writers
American film directors
American relationships and sexuality writers
Women pornographic film directors
Feminist pornography
Lambda Literary Award winners
Lecturers
American LGBT writers
LGBT people from New York (state)
Living people
Pornographic film actors from New York (state)
LGBT film directors
Queer feminists
Queer pornographic film actors
Queer women
Queer writers
Thomas Pynchon
Sex-positive feminists
Wesleyan University alumni
American women columnists
American women non-fiction writers
Polyamorous people